Bitter Fruit is a 1920 American silent film directed by Will H. Bradley and starring Jane Gail.

References

External links

1920 films
American silent feature films
American black-and-white films
1920 drama films
1920s American films